In mathematical finance, the Cox–Ingersoll–Ross (CIR) model describes the evolution of interest rates. It is a type of "one factor model" (short-rate model) as it describes interest rate movements as driven by only one source of market risk. The model can be used in the valuation of interest rate derivatives. It was introduced in 1985 by John C. Cox, Jonathan E. Ingersoll and Stephen A. Ross as an extension of the Vasicek model.

The model 

The CIR model specifies that the instantaneous interest rate  follows the stochastic differential equation, also named the CIR Process:

The drift factor, is exactly the same as in the Vasicek model. It ensures mean reversion of the interest rate towards the long run value , with speed of adjustment governed by the strictly positive parameter .

An interest rate of zero is also precluded if the condition

is met. More generally, when the rate is close to zero, the standard deviation also becomes very small, which dampens the effect of the random shock on the rate. Consequently, when the rate gets close to zero, its evolution becomes dominated by the drift factor, which pushes the rate upwards (towards equilibrium).

This process can be defined as a sum of squared Ornstein–Uhlenbeck process. The CIR is an ergodic process, and possesses a stationary distribution. The same process is used in the Heston model to model stochastic volatility.

Distribution
 Future distribution
 The distribution of future values of a CIR process can be computed in closed form:
 
 where , and Y is a non-central chi-squared distribution with  degrees of freedom and non-centrality parameter . Formally the probability density function is:

 

 Asymptotic distribution
 Due to mean reversion, as time becomes large, the distribution of  will approach a gamma distribution with the probability density of:
 

To derive the asymptotic distribution  for the CIR model, we must use the Fokker-Planck equation:

Our interest is in the particular case when , which leads to the simplified equation:

Integrating shows us that:

Over the range , this density describes a gamma distribution. Therefore, the asymptotic distribution of the CIR model is a gamma distribution.

Properties
 Mean reversion,
 Level dependent volatility,
 For given positive  the process will never touch zero, if ; otherwise it can occasionally touch the zero point,

Calibration
 Ordinary least squares
 The continuous SDE can be discretized as follows

 

which is equivalent to

 
provided  is n.i.i.d. (0,1). This equation can be used for a linear regression.
 Martingale estimation
 Maximum likelihood

Simulation
Stochastic simulation of the CIR process can be achieved using two variants:
 Discretization
 Exact

Bond pricing
Under the no-arbitrage assumption, a bond may be priced using this interest rate process. The bond price is exponential affine in the interest rate:

where

Extensions
A CIR process is a special case of a basic affine jump diffusion, which still permits a closed-form expression for bond prices. Time varying functions replacing coefficients can be introduced in the model in order to make it consistent with a pre-assigned term structure of interest rates and possibly volatilities. The most general approach is in Maghsoodi (1996). A more tractable approach is in Brigo and Mercurio (2001b) where an external time-dependent shift is added to the model for consistency with an input term structure of rates.

A significant extension of the CIR model to the case of stochastic mean and stochastic volatility is given by Lin Chen (1996) and is known as Chen model. A more recent extension for handling cluster volatility, negative interest rates and different distributions is the so-called "CIR #" by Orlando, Mininni and Bufalo (2018, 2019, 2020, 2021) and a simpler extension focussing on negative interest rates was proposed by Di Francesco and Kamm (2021, 2022), which are referred to as the CIR- and CIR-- models.

See also
 Hull–White model
 Vasicek model
 Chen model

References

Further References
 
 
 
 
 
 Open Source library implementing the CIR process in python
 

Interest rates
Fixed income analysis
Stochastic models
Short-rate models
Financial models

de:Wurzel-Diffusionsprozess#Cox-Ingersoll-Ross-Modell